Keel was a unit used to measure coal in the northeast of England, being the quantity of coal carried by a keelboat on the Tyne and Wear rivers. In 1750 it was said to be equal to 8 Newcastle chaldrons (waggons), a measure of volume, or a weight of 21.2 long tons or 424 cwt (21.54 metric tons).

See also
 Keelmen of Tyne and Wear discusses the coal-carrying keels

References

Units of volume
Units of mass
Customary units of measurement
Standards of the United Kingdom